is a 1971 book by Japanese psychoanalyst Takeo Doi, discussing at length Doi's concept of amae, which he describes as a uniquely Japanese need to be in good favor with, and be able to depend on, the people around oneself. He likens this to behaving childishly in the assumption that parents will indulge you (Doi 2001:16), and claims that the ideal relationship is that of the parent–child, and all other relationships should strive for this degree of closeness (Doi 2001:39).

Main concept
Amae is the nominal form of the verb amaeru, which Doi uses to describe the behavior of a person attempting to induce an authority figure, such as a parent, spouse, teacher, or supervisor, to take care of them. The word is rarely used of oneself, but rather is applied descriptively to the behavior of other people. The person who is carrying out amae may beg or plead, or alternatively act selfishly while secure in the knowledge that the caregiver will indulge them. The behavior of children towards their parents is perhaps the most common example of amae, but Doi argued that child-rearing practices in the Western world seek to stop this kind of dependence, whereas in Japan it persists into adulthood in all kinds of social relationships. However, these cultural concepts do not apply to indigenous cultures in Japan, such as the Ainu people or the Ryukyuan people, the latter of which replaces amae with humor.

In literary context
Doi developed this idea to explain and describe many kinds of Japanese behavior. However, Doi states that while amae is not just a Japanese phenomenon, the Japanese are the only people known to have an extensive vocabulary for describing it. The reason for this is that amae is a major factor in Japanese interaction and customs. Doi argues that nonverbal empathic guesswork ( sasshi), a fondness for unanimous agreement in decision-making, the ambiguity and hesitation of self-expression ( enryo), and the tatemae–honne dynamics are communicative manifestations of the amae psychology of Japanese people.
 
Doi translates amaeru as "to depend and presume upon another's benevolence". It indicates, for Doi, "helplessness and the desire to be loved". Amaeru can also be defined as "to wish to be loved", and denotes dependency needs. Amae is, in essence, a request for indulgence of one's perceived needs.

Doi says,

According to Doi and others, in Japan the kind of relationship based on this prototype provides a model of human relationships in general, especially (though not exclusively) when one person is senior to another. As another writer puts it:

Amae may also be used to describe the behavior of a husband who comes home drunk and depends on his wife to get him ready for bed. In Japan, amae does have a connotation of immaturity, but it is also recognized as a key ingredient in loving relationships, perhaps more so than the notions of romance so common in the West.

Reception
Doi's work has been heavily criticized by academics specializing in nihonjinron studies as being anecdotal and full of inaccuracies. (See Dale, P. 1986 The Myth of Japanese Uniqueness, Mouer and Sugimoto 1986, 1982, Kubota 1999)

Doi's work has been hailed as a distinctive contribution to psychoanalysis by the American psychiatrist Frank Johnson, who has devoted a full book-length study to Doi and to his critics.

Publication history
The Anatomy of Dependence was originally published in Japanese in 1971, and an English translation by John Bester was later published in 1973.

See also
 Nihonjinron
 Attachment theory
 Codependency
 Maslow's hierarchy of needs
 Moe (slang)

References

 Doi, T. The Anatomy of Dependence, Kodansha America, Inc., 2001. 

1971 non-fiction books
Japanese non-fiction books
Japanese family structure
Japanese values
Books about Japan
Psychology books
Books about parenting